Johann "Hans" Kniewasser (13 October 1951 – 19 October 2012) was an Austrian alpine skier.

References

1951 births
2012 deaths
Austrian male alpine skiers
20th-century Austrian people
21st-century Austrian people